Nouamghar (or Nouâmghâr) is a coastal village and rural commune in the Dakhlet Nouadhibou region of western Mauritania. The village is 150 kilometres north north-east of the capital Nouakchott and is located at the entrance to Cape Timiris. It is a traditional and active fishing port where ancient fishing techniques are used in which dolphins are used to surround and bring schools of fish closer to the coast and then they are caught in nets prepared for this purpose. The origin of this cooperation between people and dolphins is unknown.

History
The Imraguen people live in this fishing village, whose traditions rely on its ancient fishing techniques.

The town has undergone changes since the Banc d'Arguin National Park was declared a World Heritage Site as it is now the administrative centre of the park authority and one of the focal access points to the park.

Population 
At the 2000 census, Nouamghar had 4,151 inhabitants.

References

Communes of Mauritania